Monochamus carolinensis is a species of beetle in the family Cerambycidae. It was described by Guillaume-Antoine Olivier in 1792. It is known from Canada and the United States.

References

carolinensis
Beetles described in 1792